Vincent Bones is a South African singer who won the tenth season of Idols South Africa in 2014. After the voting stats were revealed Bones won almost every vote except  in the top 4 where Bongi Silinda overtook him and won the most votes.

References

21st-century South African male singers
Idols South Africa winners
Living people
Year of birth missing (living people)